Hossein Ravazadeh is an Iranian physician who practices traditional medicine, and is regarded a prominent proponent of quackery and conspiracy theory in Iran.

Practices
Ravazadeh has students and is secretary-general of the 'Islamic Society of Supporters of Iranian Agriculture', a politically conservative institution founded in 2010 that opposes genetically modified crops.

During the COVID-19 pandemic, he claimed that dropping oil extracted from citrullus colocynthis into the ears twice a day would prevent infection by the virus.

References

External links 
 Official website
 Profile at Iranian Medical Council
 Profile at CIVILICA

1956 births
Living people
Iranian conspiracy theorists
Iranian anti-vaccination activists
Iranian expatriates in Italy
Anti-GMO activists
Physicians from Tehran